TAROM Flight 371 was a scheduled international passenger flight, with an Airbus A310  from Otopeni International Airport in Romania's capital Bucharest to Brussels Airport in Brussels, Belgium. The flight was operated by TAROM, the flag carrier of Romania. On 31 March 1995, the Airbus A310-324, registered as YR-LCC, entered a nose-down dive after takeoff and crashed near Balotești in Romania. All 60 people aboard were killed in the crash.

Investigation of the crash revealed that a faulty auto-throttle reduced the left engine to idle during climb. While this was happening, the captain became incapacitated, leaving the first officer unable to respond properly to the failure as he spent most of his flying career flying Soviet-built planes with a different style Attitude Direction Indicator than on the A310. The crash was the deadliest plane crash in Romania's history. It was also the deadliest plane crash in TAROM's operational history.

Aircraft

The aircraft involved in the crash was an Airbus A310-324 registered as YR-LCC and named Muntenia after one of Romania's historical regions. The Manufacturer's Serial Number (MSN) was 450, and the aircraft had its first flight in 1987. It was delivered to Pan American World Airways in August the same year registered as N814PA and named Clipper Liberty Bell. Following Pan Am's bankruptcy in 1991, the aircraft was transferred to Delta Air Lines with the same registration. TAROM purchased the aircraft and took delivery of it in April 1994 where it was re-registered as YR-LCC. It was powered by two Pratt & Whitney PW4152 turbofan engines and had logged in 31,092 flight hours and 6,216 takeoff and landing cycles. Its airworthiness certificate was issued on 13 April 1994.

Passengers and crew
The aircraft was carrying 49 passengers and 11 crew members. Thirty-two of the passengers were from Belgium, nine from Romania, three from the United States, two from Spain, and one each from France, Thailand, and the Netherlands.

The captain of the flight was 48-year-old Liviu Bătănoiu. He had a total of 14,312 flying hours, with 1,735 on the Airbus A310. He graduated from the Aurel Vlaicu Military Aviation School in 1969. His last training on the type was on 12 November 1994 in a Swissair facility in Zurich, Switzerland.

The first officer was 51-year-old Ionel Stoi. He had a total of 8,988 flying hours, 650 on the A310. The A310 was the first and only airplane that he had flown with a Western style Attitude Direction Indicator (ADI), which works oppositely from the ADIs on Soviet-built planes he had spent most of his career flying. He graduated from the Aurel Vlaicu Military Aviation School in 1968. His last simulator training on the type was on 21 September 1994, carried out at a Swissair facility in Zurich.

Flight
TAROM Flight 371 took off at 09:06:44 local time (06:06:44 UTC) from runway 08R, with First Officer Stoi as the pilot flying. The crew knew about a pre-existing anomaly with the thrust levers, with Captain Bătănoiu stating that he would guard the throttles during the climb. Stoi then asked Bătănoiu to retract the flaps and slats. Bătănoiu retracted the flaps, but failed to retract the slats. Noticing this, Stoi asked his captain what was wrong. Bătănoiu told First Officer Stoi he felt sick, then fell silent, apparently having lost consciousness. To make matters worse, the plane's left engine moved itself back into idle, resulting in asymmetric thrust as the right engine remained at climb power. Worse still, the speed of the aircraft began to decrease and the aircraft was banking sharply to the left. Preoccupied with trying to wake Bătănoiu, Stoi did not notice the rapidly increasing left roll.

At 09:08:18 local time, the engine thrust asymmetry reached its maximum value of 0.42 and the aircraft was now banking severely to the left at an angle of 45.09 degrees. The flight data recorder recorded an attempt to engage the autopilot and a continuous thrust reduction on engine no. 2. One second later the autopilot disengaged with an aural warning and the aircraft began to lose altitude rapidly. Flight 371 began to dive towards the ground. The aircraft rolled as its airspeed continued to increase. Stoi's inexperience with Western style ADIs and the thick cloud cover led him to not know which way the plane was banking and therefore couldn't apply sufficient corrective action to recover the aircraft from its left spiral dive. Upon seeing the No. 1 Engine Pressure Ratio (EPR) gauge at 0.95, he cried out "That one has failed!" At this point, the aircraft was now nose diving with a pitch angle of -61.5 degrees. The aircraft was completely destroyed on impact, killing everyone on board instantly.

Bucharest control tower then frantically tried to contact Flight 371, but to no avail. The tower asked another aircraft flying in the vicinity to contact Flight 371, while requesting that the TAROM dispatcher contact Flight 371 as well. After confirming that Flight 371 had lost all contact, Bucharest control tower issued a "distress phase" on the flight. Search and rescue teams later found the crash site.

Investigation

Technical investigation
Investigators discovered that there was a problem with the automatic throttle system (ATS), which controls the throttle of aircraft's engines. During their examination on the aircraft's logbook, they discovered that during the aircraft's climb after takeoff, engine no. 1 had a tendency to go back to idle when switching from take-off power to climb power. The reason was unknown. After maintenance by ground crew, the malfunction did not occur again until 16 March 1995. Nonetheless, the ground crew warned about a possible recurrence of the malfunction. From the aircraft history record obtained from the FAA, a similar malfunction had been reported during its operation with Delta Air Lines. Delta performed the same actions that TAROM did.

Airbus was aware of the ATS malfunction. This defect could cause either the jamming of both throttles and ATS disconnection, or one throttle moving to idle while the other remained above climb power without ATS disconnection. Investigators stated that the most probable cause of this malfunction was due to the excessive friction in the kinematic linkages between the throttle and the ATS coupling units. At the time of the accident, the Flight Crew Operating Manual (FCOM) issued by Airbus did not include the procedures to cope with this anomaly, but the FCOM issued by TAROM and Swissair did include these procedures. The cockpit voice recorder also indicated that it appeared that Captain Bătănoiu had a health problem.

Criminal investigation
In March 1995, a criminal investigation was started by the Prosecutor's Office attached to the Bucharest Tribunal with the objective of establishing the circumstances of the air crash.
In 1997, the case was transferred from the Prosecutor's Office attached to the Bucharest Tribunal to Prosecutor's Office attached to the Bucharest Court of Appeal because of lack of legal competence. Since then, the case remains unsolved and in 2008, at the request of Prosecutor General Laura Codruța Kövesi, it has been revealed that the case files are completely missing.

Memorials
A monument dedicated to the memory of the ones who perished in the accident is located in the vicinity of the crash site.

In popular culture
In 2019, the accident was featured in the 6th episode of the 19th season of Mayday and Air Crash Investigation. The episode is titled "Fatal Climb" and premiered on 24 January 2019.

See also
List of accidents and incidents involving commercial aircraft
Manx2 Flight 7100, an accident where pilots mismanaged asymmetrical thrust on a Fairchild Metroliner, leading to a roll.
TAM Transportes Aéreos Regionais Flight 402, an incident involving thrust reverser on take-off.
Aeroflot Flight 821, where pilots improperly managed asymmetrical thrust on a 737. 
Crossair Flight 498, another accident where a pilot confused a Western style ADI with Soviet style ADI. 
Lauda Air Flight 004, a 767 that crashed after the #1 engine thrust reverser deployed in the early climb-out phase of the flight.
S7 Airlines Flight 778, another Airbus A310 accident due to asymmetrical thrust, albeit during landing.
Sriwijaya Air Flight 182, a crash of a Boeing 737 that was also caused by an autothrottle malfunction.

References

External links

 Video of the crash site from Associated Press Archive
 Planecrashinfo description
Romanian (YR) air incidents at baaa-acro.com (Archive)
 Photo of YR-LCC on airliners.net
FINAL REPORT on the Accident of the Airbus A310-324, YR-LCC

Aviation accidents and incidents in Romania
Aviation accidents and incidents in 1995
371
Airliner accidents and incidents caused by mechanical failure
Airliner accidents and incidents caused by pilot incapacitation
1995 in Romania
1995 in Belgium
Accidents and incidents involving the Airbus A310
March 1995 events in Europe
Airliner accidents and incidents caused by pilot error
1995 disasters in Romania